Ove or OVE may refer to
Ove (given name)
Ové, a surname
Ove Peak in Antarctica
A Man Called Ove (novel), a novel by Fredrik Backman
A Man Called Ove, a 2015 Swedish film based on the novel
Danish Organisation for Renewable Energy (Organisationen for Vedvarende Energi, OVE)
Ohio Versus Everything (abbreviated as "oVe"), an American professional wrestling stable.